Yangcheng was the first capital of the Xia dynasty (c. 2070–1600 BC) of China. In ancient texts, the city was founded by Yu the Great (founder of the Xia), or was his residence. In the Bamboo Annals and Shiben, Yangcheng was located near Mount Song and the Wudu and Ying rivers (close to modern Gaocheng, Henan).

Archeology
Yangcheng may be located at the Wangchenggang site in Henan. In 1977, An Jinhuai excavated a small east-west oriented walled city at Wangchenggang.; it is dated to the second period of the Longshan era, or approaching the start of the Xia. In 2002-2005, a larger walled city was discovered and radiocarbon dated as the earliest and largest Xia-period site at Wangchenggang.

An and Sun Zuoyun believed the small city to be Yangcheng, and this interpretation remained popular through the rest of the 20th century. One criticism was that the city was too small to be a capital of a major state.

Since its discovery, the larger city has been associated with Yangcheng. The smaller city has been attributed to Gun, Yu's predecessor, although Liu and Chen note that the 100 year difference between the two cities makes this unlikely.

References

Citations

Sources 

Ancient Chinese capitals
China
History of Zhengzhou
Dengfeng